Aki Kivelä (born April 4, 1992) is a Finnish ice hockey player. He is currently playing with  SaPKo in the Finnish Mestis.

Kivela made his SM-liiga debut playing with HIFK during the 2011–12 SM-liiga season.

References

External links

1992 births
Living people
Finnish ice hockey right wingers
HIFK (ice hockey) players
Ice hockey people from Helsinki